The women's freestyle 55 kilograms is a competition featured at the 2015 World Wrestling Championships, and was held in Las Vegas, United States on 10 September 2015.

This freestyle wrestling competition consisted of a single-elimination tournament, with a repechage used to determine the winners of two bronze medals. The two finalists faced off for gold and silver medals. Each wrestler who lost to one of the two finalists moved into the repechage, culminating in a pair of bronze medal matches featuring the semifinal losers each facing the remaining repechage opponent from their half of the bracket.

Each bout consists of a single round within a six-minute limit including two halves of three minutes. The wrestler who scores more points is the winner.

The American Helen Maroulis won the gold medal after dominating Irina Ologonova from Russia in the final, beating her by technical superiority 11–0. Evelina Nikolova of Bulgaria and Tetyana Kit from Ukraine shared the bronze medals. Nikolova pinned Pang of China and Kit beat Hanchar from Belarus 5–0.

Results
Legend
F — Won by fall

Main bracket

Repechage

References

Results book

External links
Official website

Women's Freestyle 55 kg
World